Shaffy Bello is a Nigerian film actress and singer. She first shot into the entertainment scene when she featured vocals in a 1997 hit song by Seyi Sodimu titled "Love Me Jeje".

Career
Shaffy grew up in the United States where she completed her education. Her first major film was Eti Keta, a Yoruba film.

In 2012, she starred as Joanne Lawson in the TV series Tinsel and as Adesuwa in Taste of Love. Shaffy has since featured in several Yoruba and English language films and TV series including When Love Happens, Gbomo Gbomo Express, and Taste of Love.

Selected filmography
Eti Keta
The Score
Tinsel
When Love Happens
Gbomo Gbomo Express
Taste of Love
It's Her Day
Ovy's Voice
Hire a Man (2017)
Light will Come
Twisted Twins
Three Thieves
The Therapist
Two Weeks in Lagos
Soft Work (2020)
Unroyal (2020)
Mama Drama (2020)
Chief Daddy
From Lagos with Love
Iboju
 Elevator Baby
Fishbone
The Men's Club
Your Excellency
Deep blue sea
Nneka the Pretty Serpent
Separated 
Chief Daddy 2: Going for Broke
Crazy Grannies
Elesin Oba, The King's Horseman (2022)
Mothers and Daughters-In-Law
The Rise of Igbinogun
Love Is War (2019 film)
Lara and the Beat
Obsession (2022 film)
The Men's Club (Nigerian web series)
Excess Luggage
Whose Meal Ticket
Moth To A Flame
40 Looks Good on You
Desperate Housewives Africa
Elesin Oba: The King's Horseman

Television 
Battleground (2017–18)

Awards and nominations

Personal life
Shafy Bello is married with two children.

See also
List of Yoruba people

References

External links

Living people
21st-century Nigerian actresses
Yoruba actresses
Nigerian expatriates in the United States
Actresses in Yoruba cinema
Nigerian film actresses
Yoruba women musicians
20th-century Nigerian women singers
Yoruba-language singers
1970 births
People from Lagos State